The 2013–14 season was FK Vardar's 22nd consecutive season in First League. This article shows player statistics and all official matches that the club was played during the 2013–14 season.

In the winter break of the season, Vardar was faced a major ownership changes. Russian businessman and an owner of ŽRK Vardar and RK Vardar Sergei Samsonenko takes over the football club, with an ambitious plans to enter a group stage of UEFA Champions League.

Squad
As of 10 February 2014

Left club during season

Competitions

Supercup

First League

League table

Results summary

Results by round

Matches

Macedonian Cup

First round

Second round

UEFA Champions League

Second qualifying round

Statistics

Top scorers

References

FK Vardar seasons
Vardar
Vardar